The 50th Indian Tank Brigade was an armoured brigade formation of the Indian Army during World War II. It was formed for service in the Burma Campaign of World War II from units of the British Army and the British Indian Army. The brigade's formation emblem was a white upraised fist and forearm on a black disc.

The 50th Indian Tank brigade was placed under the command of XV Corps in October 1944 as armoured support for the Arakan campaign and located north of Maungdaw at Waybin in early December. Units of the brigade took part in actions at Buthidaung, The Mayu Peninsula, the Myebon Peninsula and Kangaw. The brigade was withdrawn from the Arakan in February 1945.

Composition
25th Dragoons with Lee/Grant tanks
146th Regiment of the Royal Armoured Corps , raised from a Battalion of the Duke of Wellington's Regiment, with Lee/Grant tanks
19th King George's Own Lancers, with Sherman tanks
45th Cavalry, with Stuart light tanks
2/4th Bombay Grenadiers

See also

 List of Indian Army Brigades in World War II

Notes and references

Armoured brigades of the British Indian Army
Brigades of India in World War II
Military units and formations in Burma in World War II